The Palomar knot is a knot that is used for securing a fishing line to a fishing lure, snap or swivel.

To tie the knot first double 8–12 inches of line into a loop and pass it through the eye of the hook, lure or swivel. Tie a very loose overhand knot using the doubled loop and the doubled section of line leading back to the fishing rod. Pass the object to be tied through the remaining loop of the overhand knot and slide the loop up onto the line just above the eye of the hook. Moisten the knot to lessen the friction and pull on the tag and standing ends evenly to snug the knot down. Trim the free end of the line to a length of about 3mm.

This knot is good for all kinds of light fishing lines, especially braided Dacron, and retains almost all of the original line strength, even with monofilaments. It also is nearly impossible (if tied correctly) to "pull out". It is equally effective with other fastening applications – such as a dog clip to a rope – provided the object being tied to can pass through the loop, and the line or rope is not too thick to pass through the object twice, and, with practice, it can be tied in the dark with cold hands.

See also
List of knots

External links

Fishing knots